Cooper Mountain is a mountain east of Dillon in Summit County, Colorado. Grays Peak lies northeast of Cooper Mountain and Lenawee Mountain is located northwest.

References

Mountains of Colorado
Mountains of Summit County, Colorado
North American 3000 m summits